Esther Tumama Cowley-Malcolm is a Samoan-New Zealand health researcher and practitioner. Cowley-Malcolm completed a Masters degree at Auckland University of Technology in 2005. Her masters thesis was titled Some Samoans' perceptions, values and beliefs on the role of parents and children within the context of aiga/family and the influence of fa'asamoa and the church on Samoan parenting. She did her PhD in Pacific Cultural Studies at the Victoria University of Wellington, she was the first women graduate of the Pacific studies programme. Her doctoral thesis was titled Perceptions of Samoan Parents from a Small Town in New Zealand on Parenting, Childhood Aggression, and the CD-ROM 'Play Nicely' .

Offices 
 Board member of the Health Research Council of New Zealand
 Chair of the Health Research Council of New Zealand Pacific Research Advisory Committee
 Director at Te Whare Wānanga o Awanuiārangi
 Member of the Parenting Council of New Zealand
 Member of the New Zealand Medical Laboratory Science Board

Awards
 Loxley Award 2015, Quaker Peace and Service Aotearoa New Zealand

References

External links
 google scholar 
 linked-in
 brainwave
 Friends Peace Teams letter

Living people
Year of birth missing (living people)
Samoan academics
Academic staff of Te Whare Wānanga o Awanuiārangi
Auckland University of Technology alumni
Victoria University of Wellington alumni